Franco Fava (born 3 September 1952) is an Italian former long-distance runner.

Biography
Franco Fava participated at two editions of the Summer Olympics (1972, 1976), he has 29 caps in national team from 1968 to 1977.

After his sporting career Fava became a journalist and currently writes for the Corriere dello Sport.

Achievements

National titles
Franco Fava has won 13 times the individual national championship.
4 wins in 3000 metres steeplechase (1972, 1973, 1974, 1975)
2 wins in 3000 metres indoor (1974, 1979)
1 win in Half marathon (1976)
5 wins in Cross country running (1974, 1975, 1976, 1977, 1978)

References

External links
 

1952 births
Living people
Italian male cross country runners
Italian male long-distance runners
Italian male steeplechase runners
Olympic athletes of Italy
Athletes (track and field) at the 1972 Summer Olympics
Athletes (track and field) at the 1976 Summer Olympics
Mediterranean Games bronze medalists for Italy
Athletes (track and field) at the 1975 Mediterranean Games
Universiade medalists in athletics (track and field)
Mediterranean Games medalists in athletics
Universiade gold medalists for Italy
Medalists at the 1975 Summer Universiade
Medalists at the 1977 Summer Universiade
20th-century Italian people